Meganoton rubescens, the rosy double-bristled hawkmoth, is a moth of the family Sphingidae. It is known from north-eastern India, central and northern Thailand, southern China, northern Vietnam, Malaysia, Indonesia, the Philippines, Papua New Guinea, northern Australia and the Solomon Islands.

The wingspan is about 130 mm. Adults have a light and dark fawn pattern on their wings, with a small white dot edged in black near the centre of each forewing.

The larvae have been recorded feeding on Annona, Melodorum (including Melodorum leichhardtii), Kigelia (including Kigelia pinnata) and Spathodea (including Spathodea campanulata) species. They are green with a yellow patch on the thorax, and white diagonal stripes on each segment.

Subspecies
Meganoton rubescens rubescens (north-eastern India, central and northern Thailand, southern China and northern Vietnam)
Meganoton rubescens amboinicus Clark, 1938 (Moluccas)
Meganoton rubescens philippinensis Clark, 1938 (Philippines)
Meganoton rubescens severina (Miskin, 1891) (Papua New Guinea, northern Australia, Solomon Islands)
Meganoton rubescens thielei Huwe, 1906 (Borneo, Sumatra, Malaysia)
Meganoton rubescens titan Gehlen, 1933 (Moluccas)

References

Meganoton
Moths described in 1876